L'Instant d'après is the fourth studio album recorded by Canadian singer Natasha St-Pier. It was released in 2003 and met success in many countries, including France where it reached No. 3 in the country's chart. It was also received with critical acclaim.

Track listing 
 "Tant que c'est toi" (single) — 6:24
 "Quand on cherche l'amour" (single) — 3:36
 "Mourir demain" (duet with Pascal Obispo, single) — 3:37
 "Plus simple que ça" — 3:33
 "J'avais quelqu'un" (single) — 3:23
 "Je te souhaite" (single) — 3:48
 "Chacun pour soi" — 4:02
 "Pour le meilleur" — 3:06
 "Croire" — 3:29
 "J'oublie toujours quelque chose" — 3:27
 "Qu'y a-t-il entre nous?" — 3:43
 "Juste un besoin de chaleur" — 3:29
 "Quand aimer ne suffit pas" — 3:24
 "Lucie" (hidden track)

Charts

Certifications

References

2003 albums
Natasha St-Pier albums
Sony Music France albums